33 Boötis is a single star in the northern constellation Boötes, located 188 light years away from the Sun. It is visible to the naked eye as a faint, white-hued star with an apparent visual magnitude of 5.39. The object is moving closer to the Earth with a heliocentric radial velocity of −13 km/s, and is catalogued as a member of the Pleiades supercluster.

This is an ordinary A-type main-sequence star with a stellar classification of A1 V. It is a source of X-ray emission, but early A-type stars are not expected to be an X-ray source so this may indicate it has an undetected companion. 33 Boötis is 142 million years old with a projected rotational velocity of 86 km/s. The star has 2.25 times the mass of the Sun and is radiating 21 times the luminosity of the Sun from its photosphere at an effective temperature of 10,176 K.

References

A-type main-sequence stars
Boötes
Durchmusterung objects
Bootis, 33
129002
071618
5468